Clara Kalnitsky Seley (July 15, 1905 – July 2, 2003) was an American artist and sculptor.

Biography 
Born in Kiev, she came to the United States in 1911 and was raised and educated in Newark, New Jersey.

Following a career in modeling and later in the rare book departments of Bamberger's department store in Newark and Brentano's Bookstore in New York, she met and married  (May 20, 1919 – June 23, 1983), an American sculptor, in 1942. The couple moved to Port-au-Prince, Haiti, in January 1946, where Jason would teach under a U. S. Government grant and have three solo exhibitions at the Centre d'Art (in 1946, 1948, and 1949), along with several commissions. Clara, a self-taught artist, taught dance while in Haiti and began sculpting during this period. Working primarily in wood, mainly Haitian mahogany, as well as bronze and aluminum, her sculptures mostly took the forms of abstract torsos and heads.

Following their years in Haiti, the couple lived in Paris and Germany. Clara was first represented in the United States by Kraushaar Galleries in New York, although her paintings and drawings were shown by the Schainen Stern Gallery in 1960. Jason taught at Hofstra University from 1953 to 1965. Clara would later work in various media, including pastel and watercolor, in the 1940s and 1950s. She received artist's fellowships to Yaddo in 1987 and 1990. Jason, who received his BA in sculpture at Cornell University in 1940, began teaching sculpture there in 1966, becoming chair of the Department of Art (1968–73) and dean of the College of Architecture, Art and Planning (1980–83).

Clara would give several of her artworks to Cornell's Herbert F. Johnson Museum of Art. Among their other gifts to the Johnson Museum were portraits of the couple by Waldo Peirce and Lotte Jacobi. The long-planned Jason and Clara Seley Sculpture Court, featuring three sculptures by Jason, was completed at Cornell in December 2017.

Selected solo exhibitions 
 Shainen-Stern Gallery, 1959
 Roko Gallery, 1964
 Hobart and William Smith Colleges, 1973
 Gallery One-Twenty-One, Ithaca, NY, 1974
 Herbert F. Johnson Museum of Art, 1988

Exhibitions with Jason Seley 
 Country Art Gallery, 1961, 1965
 Upstairs Gallery, Ithaca, NY, 1976
 Everson Museum of Art, Syracuse, NY, 1977

References

External links 
 Clara Seley. Untitled, (before 1980). Pastel. Herbert F. Johnson Museum of Art Collection, Cornell University.
 Clara Seley. Untitled (Three Animals), 1948. Watercolor. Herbert F. Johnson Museum of Art Collection, Cornell University.
 Clara Seley. Untitled, ca. 1955. Pastel and graphite. Herbert F. Johnson Museum of Art Collection, Cornell University.

Russian women artists
1905 births
2003 deaths
Artists from the Russian Empire
Emigrants from the Russian Empire to the United States
Artists from Newark, New Jersey
Female models from New Jersey
American expatriates in Haiti
American expatriates in France
American expatriates in Germany
American women sculptors
Models from Kyiv
Sculptors from New Jersey
20th-century American women artists
20th-century American people
21st-century American women